Anuraag Saxena is an Indian activist, author and commentator. He is a founder of the India Pride Project, a volunteer effort to return to India archaeological artifacts taken out during the colonial period. Saxena was educated at the Timpany School in Visakhapatnam, and now lives in Singapore. In 2017, he began an online petition, #BringOurGodsHome, that garnered thousands of signatures from across the world. He has been featured on Washington Post, The Diplomat, the BBC, Doordarshan, The Hindu, Times of India, Hindustan Times, and the American Government publication SPAN.

Published works  
 Your Majesty: Thou shalt not steal
 Blood Buddhas: How Indian Heritage Fuels the Terror Machinery
 Indian antiquities under threat: Are we aware of the implications?
 Sunday Guardian Op Ed: Heritage Crimes
 Why be a part of Unesco if it’s not protecting or projecting India?

References 

Year of birth missing (living people)
Living people
Commentators
Indian activists
Indian male writers
Art and cultural repatriation